Rājamati is a 1995 Nepali film made in Nepal Bhasa. The first Nepal Bhasa movie is Silu, released in 1987.

Rajamati is about a luckless Newar girl named Rajamati from Kathmandu who gets involved in a series of failed relationships. The story is based on a 200-year-old ballad popular in Newar society. Rajamati was born at Taha Nani in Itum Baha, a historical and sacred neighborhood in central Kathmandu.

Cast

Hisila Maharjan as Rajamati Shakya
Shree Krishna Shrestha as Ratna
Maniraj Lawot
Madan Krishna Shrestha as Taremam Shakya (Rajamati's father)
Hari Bansha Acharya
Ganesh Ram Lachhi
Subhadra Adhikari as Ratna's mother
Rajendra Khadgi as Chikacha

The song
The song "Rajamati" is one of the most popular songs of the Newars. It also gained fame because it was played by a guard of honor during the state visit of Prime Minister Jung Bahadur to England in 1850. Maestro Seturam Shrestha made the first recording of the song on gramophone disc in Kolkata in 1908. Prem Dhoj Pradhan composed and sang Rajamti song in his own style. Prem Dhoj Pradhan sang Rajamati in various stages and functions for many many years made it very popular. He recorded Rajamati song in 1962 in Calcutta Indian, on 78 rpm gramophone.

In the song, a love-struck man tells how much he desires Rajamati, and that he will go to Kashi (Varanasi) and become an ascetic if he doesn't get to marry her. Then he describes her curly hair, long eyes, fair complexion and moles on the cheek.

The song then mentions three sunken waterspouts in Kathmandu, Thahiti uptown, Kwahiti at the southern end and Maruhiti in the center (near Kathmandu Durbar Square); and how Rajamati, who had gone to Maruhiti to fetch water, tripped on a large stone and fell flat on her back.

The singer then laments how Rajamati was given away in marriage over her protestations because of a devious matchmaker, and how she ended up in a house without a decorative window.

References

Newar
Newar-language films
1995 films
1990s musical films